Türkan Erişmiş (born 5 January 1984 in Ağrı, Turkey), aka Türkan Bozkurt, Türkan Bozkurt Erişmiş or Türkan Özata-Erişmiş, is a Turkish female middle distance runner competing mostly in the 3000 m steeplechase and cross country running events.

In 1996, at the age of twelve, she moved to Ankara leaving her parents in Ağrı. She was discovered and recommended to coach Ali Çelik in Ankara by a former athlete Sermet Timurlenk in her hometown. She was a member of Kasımpaşaspor in Istanbul before she transferred to Üsküdar Belediyespor. Currently, she is running for Beşiktaş J.K. Athletics Team.

She won the bronze medal in the 5.975 km event of U23 category at the 2006 European Cross Country Championships held in San Giorgio su Legnano, Italy.

Erişmiş earned a bronze medal in 3000 m steeplechase at the 2005 Summer Universiade held in İzmir, Turkey setting the national record. She repeated her same success at the 2007 Summer Universiade held in Bangkok, Thailand setting the national record again. She repeated her bronze medal gain at the 2009 Summer Universiade held in Belgrade, Serbia.

She participated in the 3000 m steeplechase event at the 2008 Summer Olympics without advancing to the final.

On 13 June 2009 Türkan Erişmiş set the national record in 3000 m steeplechase with 9:28.84 that lasted until 9 June 2012, to be broken by Gülcan Mıngır in Sofia, Bulgaria with 9:13.53.

Personal life
Türkan Erişmiş is married to Fahrettin Özata, a national wrestler. On 12 March 2010 she gave birth to a son, named Mustad.

Achievements

References

External links
 

1984 births
Sportspeople from Ağrı
Living people
Turkish female middle-distance runners
Turkish female steeplechase runners
Olympic athletes of Turkey
Athletes (track and field) at the 2008 Summer Olympics
Beşiktaş J.K. athletes
Universiade medalists in athletics (track and field)
Niğde University alumni
Turkish schoolteachers
Universiade bronze medalists for Turkey
Medalists at the 2005 Summer Universiade
Medalists at the 2007 Summer Universiade
Medalists at the 2009 Summer Universiade
21st-century Turkish sportswomen